Mangar may refer to varieties of the following languages:
 Mangar language (Nepal), a Sino-Tibetan language of Nepal
 Mangar language (Nigeria), a variety of the Afro-Asiatic Ron language of Nigeria